The Winton SuperSprint was an annual motor racing event for Supercars, held at Winton Motor Raceway in Winton, Victoria. The event has been a regular part of the Supercars Championship—and its previous incarnations, the Australian Touring Car Championship, Shell Championship Series and V8 Supercars Championship—between 1985 and 2022.

The event was not held in 2020 and 2021 due to the COVID-19 pandemic, but returned in 2022 before being omitted again from the 2023 calendar.

Format
The event was staged over a two-day weekend, from Saturday to Sunday. Saturday featured two thirty-minute practice sessions, then a three-stage knockout qualifying session which decided the grid positions for the following 110 kilometre race. Two separated ten-minute qualifying sessions were held on Sunday, which decided the grid for the following 110 km races.

History
Jim Richards won the first two Australian Touring Car Championship (ATCC) events at Winton in 1985 and 1986. The 1985 event marked the only time in the history of the ATCC that a Holden did not compete in the race. Richards won the race by a lap over his teammate Neville Crichton, both in BMW 635CSis, while Kevin Bartlett finished third in a Mitsubishi Starion. Richards' 1986 win came only after the Nissan Skyline of Gary Scott was excluded for using oversized front brake caliper pistons. Nissan would go on to dominate the event, winning every year from 1989 to 1992. George Fury's win in 1989 ended a fifteen-race winning streak by the Ford Sierra RS500, which had won every ATCC race in 1988 and the first six races of 1989. The race was run in wet conditions and featured various leaders, including Peter Brock in a Sierra, Fury and Mark Skaife in Skylines and Allan Grice in a Holden Commodore. Brock finished in second despite a spin while Skaife took his first ATCC podium finish.

The circuit was extended in 1997 and Larry Perkins took his first and only ATCC pole position at that year's event. His teammate Russell Ingall won all three races during the weekend to take overall victory ahead of Perkins and Glenn Seton. In the second race of the 2000 round, Seton took his final career race victory, and was leading the third race until a sudden chain of events saw Seton and four other drivers in the leading pack have incidents in the space of two corners. Eventually Jason Bargwanna held off Paul Radisich in the closest race finish in the event's history, and in doing so won his second consecutive Winton round. In the 2003 event, Greg Murphy was given a controversial drive-through penalty. Craig Lowndes lost the rear of his car going through the fast turn five and, as he applied the brakes to try to regain control, was hit by Murphy. The penalty was criticised by television commentator Neil Crompton and Lowndes said that Murphy "had been treated harshly". 

There was more controversy in 2004, when Cameron McConville passed Rick Kelly for the lead at the penultimate corner on the final lap. Brad Jones' car was stopped on the straight before the corner, with yellow flags being displayed and passing being disallowed as a result. Kelly was animated after the race, claiming that McConville had passed him in the yellow flag zone, but it was found that the pass had been made just as the two cars left the yellow flag zone and McConville kept the victory. The race dropped from the calendar in 2005 and would only return in 2006 as a late replacement for the cancelled V8 Supercars China Round. In wet conditions in 2007, Jamie Whincup moved from 20th on the grid to win the first race of the weekend, going on to win the round and breaking the then-record for the lowest starting position to win a round. The 2009 event saw the introduction of the Dunlop soft tyre, the first time that the tyre company had provided two different slick tyre compounds since becoming the control tyre supplier in 2002. 

The 2013 and 2014 events saw some success for Mercedes-Benz, Nissan and Volvo, the manufacturers which had entered the series under, what was then known as, the Car of the Future V8 Supercar rules in those two seasons. Trialling a new blend of fuel, James Moffat, driving a Kelly Racing Nissan Altima L33, took his first career victory in the first race of the 2013 event, while Lee Holdsworth gave Mercedes-Benz its first Supercars race win in the second race of the 2014 event. Scott McLaughin took his first career pole position driving a Volvo S60 in 2014. Chaz Mostert crashed out of a comfortable lead in the 2015 event, gifting team-mate Mark Winterbottom with victory. In 2016, Tim Slade took his first two career race wins to win the event, also giving local team Brad Jones Racing their first event win at the circuit. In 2018, Rick Kelly won the Saturday race only days after Nissan announced they would be withdrawing their factory support of both Kelly Racing and the championship at the end of the season. The 2020 event was postponed three weeks before being held due to the COVID-19 pandemic, and was later cancelled altogether. Its date was replaced by an additional event at Sydney Motorsport Park. The 2021 event was then postponed only two days prior to the event after another COVID-19 outbreak in Victoria, before later being once again cancelled altogether.

Winners

Multiple winners

By driver

By team

By manufacturer

Notes
  – DJR Team Penske was known as Dick Johnson Racing from 1980 to 2014, hence their statistics are combined.
  – Tickford Racing was known as Ford Performance Racing from 2003 to 2014 and as Prodrive Racing Australia from 2015 to 2017, hence their statistics are combined.

Event names and sponsors
 1985, 1988–95, 1997–2004, 2006–10, 2012: Winton
 1986: Lusty-Allison Winton Roundup
 2011: Winton 300
 2013: Winton 360
 2014: Winton 400
 2015: NP300 Navara Winton Super Sprint
 2016: Woodstock Winton SuperSprint
 2017–18: Winton SuperSprint
 2019: Truck Assist Winton SuperSprint
 2022: Pizza Hut Winton SuperSprint

See also
 List of Australian Touring Car Championship races

References

Supercars Championship races
Sports competitions in Victoria (Australia)